Christiane Lemieux (born April 11, 1969) is an interior and household goods designer. She is a founder of The Inside, a direct-to-consumer home furnishings company. Formerly, she was the founder and creative director of DwellStudio, a fashion and home design brand that was bought by Wayfair in 2013.

Early life and education
Lemieux was born in Ottawa, Ontario. She attended Queen's University in Kingston, Ontario, and the Parsons School of Design in New York.

Career
Lemieux began her career in fashion as a fabric assistant for Isaac Mizrahi. She then worked at the Gap as an assistant designer of women's woven clothing, fabric design, development and merchandising. She took a position as design director with Portico, a New York-based home company. Lemieux developed furniture, home accessories, gift items, bed linens and bath products for the company.

Lemieux left Portico to launch Dwell Home Furnishings in 1999, introducing a collection of bedding and textiles. The company has since expanded to include custom upholstered furniture, tabletop, baby, children's furniture, gift and travel items.

Lemieux launched DwellStudio for Target in January 2008.

In March 2011, Lemieux published a book, Undecorate, The No-Rules Approach to Interior Design.

In June 2012, DwellStudio opened a store in SoHo, New York, followed by an in-store boutique at Los Angeles.

In 2012, Lemieux was interviewed for the show Apartment Therapy, and, in 2013, her apartment was featured in the Lifestyle section of The Sunday Telegraph.

In 2014, Lemieux was named executive creative director of Wayfair.

In 2015, Lemieux appeared as a contest judge on the television show Ellen's Design Challenge.

In 2017, Britt Bunn, Lemieux founded the direct-to-consumer home furnishings company The Inside.

References

External links 
Profile in The New York Enterprise Report
DwellStudio

1969 births
Living people
Canadian interior designers
Queen's University at Kingston alumni
People from Ottawa